Manganese(II) sulfate usually refers to the inorganic compound with the formula MnSO4·H2O. This pale pink deliquescent solid is a commercially significant manganese(II) salt. Approximately 260,000 tonnes of manganese(II) sulfate were produced worldwide in 2005. It is the precursor to manganese metal and many other chemical compounds. Manganese-deficient soil is remediated with this salt.

Structure

Like many metal sulfates, manganese sulfate forms a variety of hydrates: monohydrate, tetrahydrate, pentahydrate, and heptahydrate. All of these salts dissolve in water to give faintly pink solutions of the aquo complex [Mn(H2O)6]2+.  The structure of MnSO4·H2O has been determined by X-ray crystallography (see figure). The tetrahydrate also features Mn(II) in an O6 coordination sphere provided by bridging two sulfate anions and four aquo ligands.

Applications and production
Typically, manganese ores are purified by their conversion to manganese(II) sulfate. Treatment of aqueous solutions of the sulfate with sodium carbonate leads to precipitation of manganese carbonate, which can be calcined to give the oxides MnOx. In the laboratory, manganese sulfate can be made by treating manganese dioxide with sulfur dioxide:
MnO2  +  SO2 + H2O  →  MnSO4(H2O)

It can also be made by mixing potassium permanganate with sodium bisulfate and hydrogen peroxide.
 
Manganese sulfate is a by-product of various industrially significant oxidations that use manganese dioxide, including the manufacture of hydroquinone and anisaldehyde.

Electrolysis 
Electrolysis of manganese sulfate reverses the above reaction yielding manganese dioxide, which is called EMD for electrolytic manganese dioxide. Alternatively oxidation of manganese sulfate with potassium permanganate yields the so-called chemical manganese dioxide (CMD). These materials, especially EMD, are used in dry-cell batteries.

Natural occurrence
Manganese(II) sulfate minerals are very rare in nature and always occur as hydrates. The monohydrate is called szmikite; the tetrahydrate is called ilesite; the pentahydrate is called jōkokuite; the hexahydrate, the most rare, is called chvaleticeite; and the heptahydrate is called mallardite.

References

Manganese(II) compounds
Sulfates
Deliquescent substances